Forza Horizon 5 is a 2021 racing video game developed by Playground Games and published by Xbox Game Studios. It is the fifth Forza Horizon title and twelfth main instalment in the Forza series. The game is set in a fictionalised representation of Mexico. It was released on 9 November 2021 for Windows, Xbox One, and Xbox Series X/S.

The game received critical acclaim and became a commercial success upon release; it launched to over ten million players in the first week, the biggest-ever launch for an Xbox Game Studios game. The game won three jury-voted awards at The Game Awards 2021, tying with Hazelight's It Takes Two for most wins, and was also nominated for the public-voted Players' Voice award, which went to fellow Xbox Game Studios title Halo Infinite.

Gameplay 

Forza Horizon 5 is a racing video game set in an open world environment based in a fictional representation of Mexico. The game has the largest map in the entire Forza Horizon series, being 50% larger than its predecessor, Forza Horizon 4, while also having the highest point in the Horizon series. The map was described by creative director Mike Brown as one of the most diverse Forza Horizon maps the team has built. The map contains an active caldera volcano, jungles and beaches, ancient Mayan temples, and towns and cities such as Guanajuato. Players can explore the open world freely, though they can also compete in multiplayer races and complete the campaign mode. Both the cars featured in the game and the player character can be extensively customised. Players are able to create custom liveries and tunes for cars, and perform engine swaps, drivetrain swaps, or install body kits on certain vehicles. The game is the first in the franchise to support ray tracing on cars (although this is only available in Forzavista). 

The game introduces a new weather system (local weather) in which players can visit one side of the map and can visibly see a storm. Because Mexico is such a vast nation with such a wide range of elevations, multiple climates would appear in the game at around the same time. The four seasons still exist but would affect the eleven unique biomes around the map. For example, in the dry season, dust storms will appear, while tropical storms occur throughout the fall storm season. Another detail is in the jungle, in which the environment would now react to the weather; an example of this is leaves flying everywhere.

Forza Horizon 5 also introduces a brand new Horizon Arcade. This consists of a series of mini-multiplayer games strewn across the map. One of these mini-multiplayer games is called "Piñata pop" where the Horizon Festival's cargo plane drops piñatas. The goal is to pop as many piñatas as they can with the help of other players. It also introduces the "EventLab", a toolset in which players can create custom games, races, and more depending on their personal preference. A new feature called "Forza Link" was introduced. According to Brown, it is an AI assistant that tracks the current statuses of players, helping them to link with other players online and play together. Forza Link can also link players' GPS systems if they accept the invitation from another player. Accolades, new to the Forza Horizon series, allow players to collect points and prizes for completing certain tasks. Some vehicles can only be unlocked through the completion of the Accolades. There are over 1,800 accolades for the player to achieve.

The Eliminator battle royale game mode introduced in Forza Horizon 4 returns, albeit with players starting in a 1963 Volkswagen Beetle rather than a 1965 Mini. The world is designed for the mode unlike the previous game, which received The Eliminator after launch. As in the previous game, players can buy in-game houses ranging from small beachside cabanas to even a hotel, which can unlock rewards such as Wheelspins and the right to Fast Travel. The game features over 600 licensed vehicles.

Due to licensing issues, vehicles from Alfa Romeo, Fiat (including Abarth marque) and Lancia were not present in the base game. Prior to the release of Forza Horizon 5, the Stratos HF Stradale was shown in a video covering car audio but it was scrapped in the released game.

Content and gameplay updates 
Forza Horizon 5 has seen many content updates and bug fixes since its release. Monthly content updates include new cars, collectibles, horns, clothing, etc. These updates typically have a specific theme; for example, the Series 2 update in December 2021 was based around Christmas. Many updates also include series-specific map changes, for example, the Series 5 update introduced a stunt park located in the stadium on the map. This game is the first in the franchise to introduce new map changes, aside from seasons.

On 1 March 2022, American and British Sign language interpreter videos in a picture-in-picture format for cinematics were added.

The Series 13 update, released on 11 October 2022, celebrated the tenth anniversary of the Forza Horizon series, adding new content to the game in celebration.  This included a new radio station titled "Horizon Mixtape", featuring a total of fifteen music tracks from the previous four entries (six tracks available from the start, five unlockable tracks via accolades by completing each chapter of the Horizon Story "Horizon Origins", and four tracks unlockable via completing limited-time seasonal championships in the Festival Playlist) along with recreations of key moments of the five games' initial drive sequences in the new Horizon Story "Horizon Origins"—with Horizon Bass Arena DJ and Horizon Mixtape host Scott Tyler (voiced by Ronan Summers), the only Forza Horizon series character to have appeared in every game so far, joining the player—the return of Midnight Battles from Forza Horizon 3, and new achievements, accolades, and badges. Each of the previous four entries' title screens was also recreated by Playground Games within the game world of Forza Horizon 5, with each season (week) of Series 13 using a recreated title screen corresponding to a different game; Forza Horizon in summer, Forza Horizon 2 in autumn, Forza Horizon 3 in winter, and Forza Horizon 4 in spring.

The Series 14 update, released on 10 November 2022, added a new Horizon Story featuring the members of Donut Media. In November 2022, after a money-making exploit was discovered in the game's Super7 mode, Playground Games disabled the game's auction house and later released a patch to fix the exploit. However, they announced that the auction house would remain closed for the time being to rebalance the game's economy.

Expansions 
The game's first expansion, Forza Horizon 5: Hot Wheels, a follow-up to a similar expansion for Forza Horizon 3, was released on 19 July 2022. This announcement was accidentally leaked via a Steam listing three days before its official announcement.

Development

Forza Horizon 5 was developed by Playground Games. The goal for the team was to create a game whose scale was significantly larger than its predecessors. The team chose Mexico as the game's setting due to its diverse and varied landscape. The team partnered with Mexican artists to create the in-game murals, and Mexican musicians to create the in-game soundtracks. It also sent a team to visit Mexico to capture real-world light and sky data. The game utilised photogrammetry data extensively in order to make the game's virtual environment to look similar to its real-life counterpart. An example of this is the rocks in the side of the caldera volcano where they can be viewed with such detail. Individual objects, such as the needles of cholla cacti, can also be displayed by the game (although this is only available for the Xbox Series consoles as of now).

Playground Games took a new approach to car audio in Horizon 5, switching implementation from looping to granular synthesis. To prepare audio recordings for this, they captured cars performing full acceleration sweeps from idle to redline and then let the cars slow to a stop. Microphones with flat frequency responses were selected, and padded to prevent damage and clipping from loud exhausts. Cockpit noise was recorded with both stereo and ambisonic microphones mounted centrally in the car. The team, with assistance from audio outsourcing companies, recorded 320 engines for the game, some samples usable for multiple cars that share engines. Additional recording included ambient environments and collisions. All sounds were recorded just for the game, with none sourced from existing libraries. The soundtrack can be output through Dolby Atmos.

Forza Horizon 5 was announced during Microsoft and Bethesda's showcase at E3 2021. The game was released for Windows, Xbox One, and Xbox Series X and Series S on 9 November 2021.

Reception 

Forza Horizon 5 received "universal acclaim" according to review aggregator Metacritic. 

Game Informer appreciated the social interactions in the game, especially the score comparisons, "More times than I could count, I noticed my friend hit a higher top speed, causing me to turn around and try the challenge again". Ars Technica liked the visuals of the title, praising how it looked "next-gen", "I seriously cannot keep track of how many times FH5 made my eyes bulge. The game takes special care to emphasize massive vistas... with screen-bursting HDR effects doing wonders for a richly saturated canvas of cities, sunsets, and scenery". While criticizing the car handling for making the game too easy, Rock Paper Shotgun enjoyed the new additions to the formula like the EventLab creator and Super7 events, "If you’ve played a Forza Horizon game before then you might feel a slight sense of deja vu, but you won’t care as the formula has been perfected at last". Eurogamer praised Horizon 5's open world of Mexico, writing that "The map is an absolute wonder, backed by a game engine which can deliver staggering views across the whole thing from the summit of the volcano that towers over it. The environments are rich and saturated with colour and atmosphere, from humid swamps to arid dunes, from deep, verdant canyons to pastel-striped barrios".

Polygon liked the settings to tune difficulty and handling, but felt the game bombarded you with too many events and activities at once, "I feel constantly pinged with mentions and suggestions, from all directions, like two teenagers are blowing up my DMs". The Verge felt the progression systems were less confusing overall compared to 3, and praised how the player could choose what to do next, "You’re able to choose which specific types of events to unlock as you progress... I feel like if I stopped playing the game and came back to it weeks later, I’d have a much better sense of what I’d been doing".

The game was selected as IGNs Game of the Year.

Commercial performance
Before the game's release on 9 November, over 1.2 million players had accessed the game by buying either the premium edition of the game or the premium add-ons bundle as an Xbox Game Pass subscriber, with Video Game Chronicle estimating gross revenue between $54 million and $118 million before release. The game also reached 1 on the Steam weekly charts for the week of 1 to 7 November 2021. Phil Spencer, head of Xbox, announced on 9 November that more than 4.5 million people have played the game in less than 24 hours after launch, the largest launch for an Xbox Game Studios game, while it also held three times more concurrent players than Forza Horizon 4. On 18 November, the official Forza Horizon Twitter account announced that over ten million people have played the game during its first week of release, the largest amount of players for a game's first week in the Xbox brand's history. Writing for Forbes, Erik Kain attributes the game's success to its at-launch availability on Xbox Game Pass, cross-platform play between Xbox One, Xbox Series X/S, and PC, its cloud gaming support via Xbox Cloud Gaming, and the high quality of the game itself. On 9 January 2022, two months after its release, the game passed the 15 million player mark, breaking the record for the previous game in the series in less than a year since it was released. The game attracted more than 20 million players seven months after its initial release.

Awards and accolades

Notes

References

External links
 

2021 video games
Forza
Microsoft games
Multiplayer and single-player video games
Open-world video games
Racing video games
Video games developed in the United Kingdom
Video games set in Mexico
Windows games
Xbox Cloud Gaming games
Xbox One games
Xbox One X enhanced games
Xbox Play Anywhere games
Xbox Series X and Series S games
British Academy Games Award for British Game winners
The Game Awards winners
D.I.C.E. Award for Racing Game of the Year winners
Sumo Digital games